Kerzner is a surname. Notable people with the surname include:

Dave Kerzner, American musician, songwriter, producer and sound designer
Harold Kerzner (born ca 1940), American engineer, management consultant
Michael Kezner, Canadian politician
Liana Kerzner (born 1978), Canadian television host, writer and producer
Sol Kerzner (1935–2020), South African accountant and business magnate